Jamie Merillo (born 27 November 1972) is an Australian rules footballer who played for the Fremantle Dockers between 1995 and 1997. He was drafted from Claremont in the WAFL as a foundation selection in the 1994 AFL Draft and played mainly as a rover.

Merillo broke his jaw in Fremantle's inaugural AFL match in 1995, but still managed to play 11 games that year.  After only 4 more game in the next two seasons, he was delisted at the end of the 1997 season. 

He was also a very good swimmer who competed in the backstroke finals of the Australian team qualifying trials for the Barcelona Olympics.

References

External links

1972 births
Fremantle Football Club players
Claremont Football Club players
Living people
Australian rules footballers from Western Australia
West Perth Football Club players
Subiaco Football Club players
Peel Thunder Football Club players